The Camp Methodist Church is a historic Methodist church on Arkansas Highway 9 in Camp, Arkansas. The church was built in 1878 to serve the Camp Methodist Congregation; it was constructed by local carpenters in a vernacular style with Gothic Revival features. A school operated in the church building until 1914. In the 1980s, church services were briefly cancelled due to the shrinking congregation; former church members rehabilitated the church in 1983, after which services began again. The church was added to the National Register of Historic Places on May 9, 1997.

The building was listed on the National Register of Historic Places in 1997.

See also
National Register of Historic Places listings in Fulton County, Arkansas

References

Churches on the National Register of Historic Places in Arkansas
Carpenter Gothic church buildings in Arkansas
Churches completed in 1878
Churches in Fulton County, Arkansas
Methodist churches in Arkansas
National Register of Historic Places in Fulton County, Arkansas